William Clifford Sander (4 November 1931 – 8 February 2022), known as Cliff Sander, was an Australian association football player who played as a midfielder.

Club career
Sander played for the Ipswich Tech before moving to St Helens in 1948. He won the Queensland championship with St Helens at the age of 17 and the premiership in 1956. In 1958 he signed with Brisbane Azzurri. With Brisbane Azzurri, he won the premiership in 1961.

International career
Sander made his Australia national team debut in 1950 against New Caledonia. He went on to play 21 times for the Socceroos. Eight of those matches were 'A' internationals. Sander represented Australia at the 1956 Summer Olympics.

Personal life
Sander died on 8 February 2022, at the age of 90.

References

External links
 

1931 births
2022 deaths
Australian soccer players
Association football midfielders
Footballers at the 1956 Summer Olympics
Olympic soccer players of Australia
Brisbane City FC players